The Hanover Stadtbahn is a Stadtbahn (light rail) system in the city of Hanover, Lower Saxony, Germany. The Stadtbahn opened on 29 September 1975, gradually replacing the city's tramway network over the course of the following 25 years. As of 2007, it transported 125 million passengers per year.

Three types of light rail cars operate on the system, the TW 6000, built from 1974 to 1993, the TW 2000 (the so-called "Silberpfeil"), built from 1997 to 1999, and the TW 3000, which was first introduced into A line service in 2015. The system is extensively used, especially during trade shows on the Hanover fairground like CeBIT or the Hannover Messe. It makes up for more than 60% of the GVH transport association's total traffic, spanning over four cities and two counties. Hanover Stadtbahn is complemented by DB-owned Hanover S-Bahn, a suburban heavy rail network which links the outlying suburbs and towns, as well as Hanover Airport, to the city centre.

Network

The main Stadtbahn networks
The Stadtbahn is a mixture of traditional tramways, of which 82% have been upgraded so far to have their own right-of-way, and an U-Bahn-like system of tunnels in the city centre.
It is owned by infra GmbH and covers nearly the whole city area. Parts of the Stadtbahn reach into the neighbouring towns of Garbsen, Isernhagen, Langenhagen, Laatzen and Ronnenberg as well as into the town of Sarstedt, which is in the borough of Hildesheim. The operator's concession is held by üstra Hannoversche Verkehrsbetriebe AG.
The system currently consists of three full Stadtbahn route networks, respectively named (with their defining tunnels in brackets):

A (Waterlooplatz – Lister Platz)
B (Vahrenwald – Döhren)
C (Königsworther Platz – Braunschweiger Platz)

A fourth tunnel, to be used for the D line (Goethestraße – Sallstraße), has been proposed but has not been realised so far due to the high costs of construction, currently estimated to be around € 1 billion. Nevertheless, the above-ground parts of the D line, most notably the D Süd, connecting the Hanover fairground to the C tunnel, have been upgraded to proper Stadtbahn standards, some preparations for interchange with the current stations, such as an empty station below the current Hauptbahnhof station, have also been built in the past.

The entire Stadtbahn network uses various colours to differentiate between the main route networks. For example, a station that serves both A and B lines has a blue and a red stripe on its station sign; stop on the D line would feature a lime stripe on the station sign, and so on. This scheme sometimes also recurs in the architecture of the stations, for example Kröpcke station used to feature tiling that changed colour when changing between lines, i.e. yellow elements were  introduced in the red tiles when walking from the B to the C part of the station.

Individual lines operate within the main route networks, diverting to various terminals at the city's edge. Currently, the Hanover Stadtbahn system consists of 12 main lines (Lines 1–11 & 17), along with one weekend express night line (Line 10E) and two supplementary lines (Lines 16 & 18). The numbers are assigned to the lines as following (lines that only run during exhibitions on the Hanover fairground (i.e. supplementary lines) are denoted in italics):

 A network – Lines 3, 7, 9
 B network – Lines 1, 2, 8, 18
 C network – Lines 4, 5, 6, 11, 16
 D network – Lines 10, 17 and 10E* (*10E is a weekend express night service line, using parts of the A tunnel)

Whilst the number 6 and 16 services use a large part of the D line, they are still denoted as C services by using the colour yellow on station signage.

The main hub and transfer point of the network is Kröpcke, a large subterranean station in the city centre. Lines 1–9, 11, 16 and 18 all call at this station, making it possible to reach every point on the A, B or C route networks from every other point with only one change.

The D tunnel

One proposed major tunnel that was part of the 1965 plans has not been built so far and probably will never be. The city centre tunnel for the D line was originally supposed to run from a ramp at Goethestraße via Steintor – Hauptbahnhof/ZOB – Berliner Allee – Sallstraße to Bahnhof Bismarckstraße, resurface on a ramp at Lindemannallee and continue to Bischofsholer Damm.
Whilst some preparations have been made, most notably an empty station under today's Hauptbahnhof station and a special arrangement of pillars at stations Steintor and Marienstraße to allow a tunnel to be built underneath, the plans could not be realised, due to the high costs. It would however have been greatly beneficial to the D line, reducing stepover times to other lines. The current surface D line between Goetheplatz and Aegidientorplatz is regarded as a permanent solution for the mid-term future, although this statement could be argued against, for example when the wye at Steintor was demolished after the tearing down of tram tracks that had been replaced by the C-Nord line, the points were not removed but just welded shut. During the renovation of the Hauptbahnhof in 1999 and 2000, the tram tracks in front of the station were not replaced either.

üstra started undertaking major improvement works on the D line in 2017. This is called "Projekt zehn-siebzehn" (see below) and consists of renovating the existing surface line instead of building new tunnels.

Dead tunnels
Even though it is of a relatively young age, the Hanover Stadtbahn already has some buildings that are likely not to be used as intended. These are three tunnel stubs in the A and B tunnels.

Under both the ramps Hammersteinstraße (A-Nord) and Vahrenwalder Platz (B-Nord) the tunnel continues until the ramp's end since the original U-Bahn plans had proposed an extension of the tunnels. Whilst this made some theoretical sense at the A-Nord due to the relatively narrow Podbielskistraße, an extension of the tunnel is completely unneeded on the rather wide Vahrenwalder Straße. The stubs currently house some technical service rooms.

A notably larger structure exists behind the middle tracks of the station Waterloo. It was originally supposed to extend a tunnel toward the A-West (line 9 toward Empelde) and to construct a turning loop. However, this would require tearing down the current A-West ramp at Gustav-Bratke-Allee which would disconnect the Glocksee depot from the network. Thus, this will likely never be carried out.

History

Stadtbahn lines opened

See also
üstra
intalliance AG
TW 6000
TW 2000
TW 3000
Stadtbahn
List of rapid transit systems

References

External links

üstra Hannoversche Verkehrsbetriebe
Großraum-Verkehr Hannover
Stadtbahn/tram Hannover

Light rail in Germany
Underground rapid transit in Germany
Tram transport in Germany
Stadtbahn